The Whitmore Mountains are an isolated mountain range of the Transantarctic Mountains System, located in the Marie Byrd Land region of West Antarctica.

They consist of three mountains and a cluster of nunataks extending over 15 miles. The group was visited and surveyed on January 2, 1959, by William H. Chapman, cartographer with the Horlick Mountains Traverse Party (1958–59). The mountains were named by Chapman for George D. Whitmore, Chief Topographic Engineer of the United States Geological Survey (USGS), who was a member of the Working Group on Cartography of the Scientific Committee on Antarctic Research.

Geological features

Linck Nunataks 
Linck Nunataks is a group of four small, ice-covered nunataks at the southeast end of the Whitmore Mountains. Three of the nunataks are together and aligned while the fourth lies 2.5 miles distant. They were visited and surveyed on January 2, 1959, by the Horlick Mountains Traverse Party. William H. Chapman, party surveyor, proposed the naming for M. Kerwin Linck, Chief of the Branch of Special Maps of the USGS.

Mount Radlinski 
Mount Radlinski is a rounded, smooth, ice-covered mountain (2,750 m) rising 4 miles southeast of Mount Seelig in the northeast part of the Whitmore Mountains. It was surveyed on January 2, 1959, by William H. Chapman, a member of the Horlick Mountains Traverse (1958–59). Mount Radlinski was named by Chapman after William A. Radlinski, United States Geological Survey (USGS) photogrammetrist, 1949–79; associate director of USGS, 1969–79; president, American Society of Photogrammetry, 1968; president, International Federation of Surveyors, 1973–75.

Mount Seelig 
It was surveyed on January 2, 1959, by William H. Chapman of USGS, a member of the Horlick Mountains Traverse Party, 1958–59. He named the mountain after Walter R. Seelig, Office of Polar Programs, National Science Foundation, 1960–86, who developed the USGS-NSF plan for topographic mapping of Antarctica; NSF Representative in Christchurch, N.Z., during eleven United States Antarctic Research Program (USARP) austral seasons between 1971 and 1986, including seventeen trips to Antarctica and adjacent seas; member, United States Advisory Committee on Antarctic Names, 1973–86; chairman, 1976–86.

References

Mountain ranges of Marie Byrd Land
Transantarctic Mountains